The University of Michigan School for Environment and Sustainability (SEAS) is an interdisciplinary professional school focused on the environmental natural and social sciences, environmental justice, and sustainable landscape architecture. SEAS provides graduate-level degrees at the master’s and doctorate levels, along with undergraduate degrees through the Program in the Environment (PitE), a university-wide collaboration.
 
Situated within the nation’s No. 1 public research university, SEAS has been a pioneer in environmental education, research, and activism for more than a century. Building upon the University of Michigan’s Department of Forestry, established in 1903, SEAS was founded as the School of Forestry and Conservation in 1927. The school is headquartered in the LEED-certified Samuel Trask Dana Building on the university’s central campus in Ann Arbor, a top-ranked college town and thriving cultural center.

Description
At SEAS, we’re turning knowledge into impact—from research to implementation and engagement. Our deeply interdisciplinary environment supports expansive creativity and effective problem-solving—allowing us to address complex environmental issues from every angle on every scale. 

This is how SEAS is meeting the future: transforming the challenges of today into hope and opportunity for tomorrow.

WORLD-CLASS FACULTY AND ALUMNI

The SEAS and undergraduate Program in the Environment (PitE) faculty—now nearly 90 strong—are 21st-century scholars and dedicated mentors leading cutting-edge research programs regionally, nationally, and around the globe.
 
Together, SEAS and PitE now boast the largest alumni population of any environment and sustainability program in the nation, numbering more than 12,300. Their efforts in climate action, conservation, environmental justice, sustainable development, energy and sustainable systems, environmental planning, behavior, education, communication, sustainable business, environmental economics, ecosystem management, environmental data science, sustainable landscape architecture, and public policy continue to make impacts in every state and in 80 countries.
 
The SEAS Environmental Justice program was the first academic environmental justice program in the nation and remains at the forefront of the field’s teaching, research, scholarship, and advocacy. Equity and justice are central to all that we teach, and all that we do.

Degree programs 
Bachelor of Science (BS)/Bachelor of Arts (BA)
The Program in the Environment (PitE) is a university-wide collaborative undergraduate program overseen by SEAS and the College of Literature, Science, and the Arts.

 
Master of Science (MS)
This professional degree program prepares students for leadership positions in environmental sustainability.

MS Program Specializations:

 Behavior, Education and Communication
 Ecosystem Science and Management - Conservation Ecology
 Environmental Justice
 Environmental Policy and Planning
 Geospatial Data Sciences - Environmental Informatics
 Sustainability & Development
 Sustainable Systems

Master of Landscape Architecture (MLA) Programs:
The SEAS MLA program is one of the nation’s first and is among the very few programs in the world that employ ecological principles authentically in environmentally responsible design.

Students pursuing an M.L.A. degree choose from two tracks:
 Three-year accredited M.L.A. degree
 Two-year program for those individuals interested in obtaining a second degree in landscape architecture at the master’s level, practicing landscape architects seeking advanced education, and those interested in pursuing a doctoral degree

Doctoral programs 
SEAS’ doctoral program develops the creative abilities of select exceptional students, training them for independent work that contributes to original research and scholarship at the forefront of their chosen fields.
 
SEAS offers a PhD in Environment and Sustainability with two primary tracks:
 Resource Ecology Management, with an ecology and science focus
 Resource Policy and Behavior, with a social science focus.

MS dual-degree programs 
SEAS offers five formal dual-degree programs with the following University of Michigan schools:
 Michigan Law
 Ross School of Business (Erb Program)
 College of Engineering
Taubman College of Architecture and Urban Planning
Gerald R. Ford School of Public Policy

In addition to the above administration-approved dual-degree programs, SEAS students have initiated dual degrees with other University of Michigan programs, including:

 Design
 Ecology and Evolutionary Biology
 Economics
 Education
 Public Health
 Public Policy
 Social Work
 Sociology

Graduate certificates 
SEAS also offers the following graduate certificate programs for any graduate student concurrently enrolled at the University of Michigan:
 Sustainability
 Industrial Ecology
 Spatial Analysis
 Environmental Justice
 Climate Change Solutions

Centers and Initiatives 
“THE GREAT LAKES UNIVERSITY”
 
SEAS hosts three of the major Great Lakes research centers at U-M that receive funding from the National Oceanic and Atmospheric Administration (NOAA).
 Cooperative Institute for Great Lakes Research (CIGLR)
 Great Lakes Integrated Science and Assessments (GLISA)
 Michigan Sea Grant 
 
The creation of new centers and major initiatives enables SEAS to tackle the impacts of climate change, advance research, and promote environmental justice—while forging new community partnerships. The following are among the most recent:
 The SEAS Sustainability Clinic in Detroit
 The Berman Western Forest and Fire Initiative 
 The Tishman Center for Social Justice and the Environment
 The Equity and Justice Initiative
 Institute for Global Change Biology
 
Among the ongoing centers and initiatives at SEAS are:
 Sustainable Food Systems Initiative
 The Center for Sustainable Systems
 The Erb Institute: Advancing Business Sustainability

An Environment for Discovery 
Place-based learning is a hallmark of the SEAS education, and many of our students travel throughout the country and around the globe. From master’s projects in places like Puerto Rico, to Colorado and Washington, D.C., we work hand-in-hand with communities to have a true impact. Closer to home, our state of Michigan—surrounded by the Great Lakes—provides an array of ecosystems to study and explore. SEAS itself manages six natural areas totaling 1,761 acres near campus, and the university’s Matthaei Botanical Gardens, Nichols Arboretum, and Biological Station provide an additional 14,000 acres for field study.

Student organizations 
The University of Michigan is home to 1,600 registered, student-run clubs and organizations on campus, many of which involve meaningful community engagement and social justice work, The most popular among SEAS students are listed below. 
 SEAS student government
 People of the Global Majority in the Environment (PGMEnt)
 Minorities in Agriculture, Natural Resources, and Related Sciences (MANRRS)
 Student Chapter of the American Society of Landscape Architects
 Graduate Rackham International (GRIN)
 Students of Color at Rackham (SCOR)
 Art and the Environment (ArtEco)
 The Student Sustainability Coalition
 Out at SEAS
 SEAS Black Student Group

Ann Arbor Campus and Community 
Ranked the No. 1 most-educated city in America by Forbes magazine, Ann Arbor is a national center for the arts, hosting cultural and intellectual events such as the Royal Shakespeare Company, the Berlin Philharmonic, and concerts brought to campus by the University Musical Society. Nationally acclaimed events like the Ann Arbor Art Fair draw nearly half a million visitors every year. 
 
SEAS offers a full slate of environmental career forums, along with lectures by renowned figures such as Vice President Al Gore, National Geographic photographer Jimmy Chin, prominent geographer Mei-Po Kwan, father of environmental justice Dr. Bob Bullard, and the Dalai Lama. University-wide activities such as sporting events, film festivals, symposia, and musical performances are listed events on the SEAS events calendar and the U-M events website.

References

Natural Resources and Environment
Educational institutions established in 1927
1927 establishments in Michigan
University of Michigan campus